Thymolphthalein is a phthalein dye used as an acid–base (pH) indicator. Its transition range is around pH 9.3–10.5. Below this pH, it is colorless; above, it is blue. The molar extinction coefficient for the blue thymolphthalein dianion is 38,000 M−1 cm−1 at 595 nm.

Thymolphthalein is also known to have use as a laxative and for disappearing ink.

Preparation
Thymolphthalein can be synthesized from thymol and phthalic anhydride.

References

PH indicators
Triarylmethane dyes
Phthalides
Phenols
Isopropyl compounds